Patrick Jahn (born 22 February 1983 in East Berlin, East Germany) is a retired German football player. He spent one season in the Bundesliga with FC Energie Cottbus. He retired in January 2009 for family reasons.

References

External links
  
 

1983 births
Living people
German footballers
FC Energie Cottbus players
FC Energie Cottbus II players
FC Hansa Rostock players
Bundesliga players
2. Bundesliga players
Association football defenders
People from East Berlin
Footballers from Berlin
People from Treptow-Köpenick
Greifswalder SV 04 players
21st-century German people